Long County High School is a public high school located in Ludowici, Georgia, United States. The school is part of the Long County School District, which serves Long County.

Notable alumni
 Tariq Carpenter, American football player
 Jamin Davis, American football player
 Dustin McGowan, baseball player

References

External links 
 

Schools in Long County, Georgia
Public high schools in Georgia (U.S. state)